The 1941–42 Detroit Red Wings season was the 16th season for the Detroit NHL franchise, tenth as the Red Wings.

Offseason

Regular season

Final standings

Record vs. opponents

Schedule and results

Playoffs

(5) Detroit Red Wings vs. (6) Montreal Canadiens

Detroit wins best-of-three series 2–1.

(3) Boston Bruins vs. (5) Detroit Red Wings

Detroit wins best-of-three series 2–0.

(2) Toronto Maple Leafs vs. (5) Detroit Red Wings

Toronto wins the Stanley Cup 4–3.

Player statistics

Regular season
Scoring

Goaltending

Playoffs
Scoring

Goaltending

Note: GP = Games played; G = Goals; A = Assists; Pts = Points; +/- = Plus-minus PIM = Penalty minutes; PPG = Power-play goals; SHG = Short-handed goals; GWG = Game-winning goals;
      MIN = Minutes played; W = Wins; L = Losses; T = Ties; GA = Goals against; GAA = Goals-against average;  SO = Shutouts;

Awards and records

Transactions

See also
1941–42 NHL season

References

Bibliography

External links
 

Detroit
Detroit
Detroit Red Wings seasons
Detroit Red Wings
Detroit Red Wings